Regine Heitzer (born 16 February 1944) is a retired Austrian figure skater. She competed at the 1960 and 1964 Winter Olympics and won a silver medal in the singles event in 1964. Between 1960 and 1965 she also won 11 medals at European and world championships. In 1967 she turned professional and skated for Vienna Ice Revue and Holiday on Ice. She retired in 1971 due to a knee injury and rarely danced since then – in 1979 she skated with Emmerich Danzer to promote the World Championships in Vienna.

In the 1970s she turned to her father's business, wholesale upholstery fabrics, investing her earnings from her professional career. She eventually took over the company and converted it to a furniture store before retiring in 2010. In 1996 she was awarded a Decoration of Honour for Services to the Republic of Austria.

Results

References

1944 births
Living people
Austrian female single skaters
Olympic figure skaters of Austria
Figure skaters at the 1960 Winter Olympics
Figure skaters at the 1964 Winter Olympics
Olympic silver medalists for Austria
Olympic medalists in figure skating
World Figure Skating Championships medalists
European Figure Skating Championships medalists
Medalists at the 1964 Winter Olympics